John Richard Goodman (born November 21, 1958 in Oklahoma City, Oklahoma) is a former American football defensive end in the National Football League. Goodman played college football at Oklahoma for head coach Barry Switzer, and was drafted by the Pittsburgh Steelers in the second round of the 1980 NFL Draft.

Personal life
He currently resides in Edmond, Oklahoma. Goodman's daughter, Chelsea Goodman, attended Oklahoma as a high jumper. She is currently married and has two children with Philadelphia Eagles' offensive tackle Lane Johnson.

References

1958 births
Living people
American football defensive ends
American football defensive tackles
Oklahoma Sooners football players
Pittsburgh Steelers players
Sportspeople from Oklahoma City